The Townsville Peace Agreement was signed in Townsville, Australia on 15 October 2000 between the Malaita Eagle Force and the Isatabu Freedom Movement. The Agreement successfully calmed the situation in Honiara and the Islands in general after the coup d’état of June that year.

See also
 Operation RAMSI

References

External links
 Australian Government media release
Full Text of Townsville Peace Agreement
Text of all peace accords for Solomon Islands

History of the Solomon Islands
Politics of Southeast Asia
Politics of Oceania
2000 in the Solomon Islands
2000 in Australia
Peace treaties
Treaties of the Solomon Islands
Treaties concluded in 2000
2000s in Queensland